During the 15th Canadian Parliament, there was no change in representation by women. Four women ran for seats in the Canadian House of Commons in the 1925 federal election but Agnes Macphail, first elected in 1921, continued to be the only woman elected.

Party Standings

Members of the House of Commons

References 

Lists of women politicians in Canada